Step Brothers may refer to:

 The Four Step Brothers, an African-American dance group
 Step-brother, a member of a stepfamily in which someone has a sibling with remarried parents.
 Step Brothers (duo), an American hip hop supergroup and record production team
 Step Brothers (film), a 2008 American comedy film
 Stepbrothers (1957 film), a 1957 Japanese drama film
 Step Brothers (EP), by G-Eazy and Carnage (2017)

See also
 Step-brother, male children born of two different families who have been joined by the marriage of at least one of their respective parents